The Best American Poetry 1995, a volume in The Best American Poetry series, was edited by David Lehman and by guest editor Richard Howard.

For this edition of the series, Howard announced that "poets whose work has appeared three or more times in this series are here and now ineligible, as are all seven former editors of the series".

Poets and poems included

See also
 1995 in poetry

Notes

External links
 Web page for contents of the book, with links to each publication where the poems originally appeared

Best American Poetry series
1995 poetry books
American poetry anthologies